George Walter Aschenbrenner (October 4, 1881 – November 24, 1952) was an American gymnast. He competed in four events at the 1904 Summer Olympics. Aschenbrenner was born in Chicago, Illinois, and died there as well.

References

External links
 

1881 births
1952 deaths
American male artistic gymnasts
Gymnasts at the 1904 Summer Olympics
Olympic gymnasts of the United States
Sportspeople from Chicago